Rimna is a village located in Bheri municipality in Jajarkot District of Karnali Province of Nepal. The aerial distance from Rimna to Nepal's capital Kathmandu is approximately 319 km.

See also
 Bheri, Jajarkot

References

Villages in Jajarkot District
Populated places in Jajarkot District